Gerhard Karl Mitter (30 August 1935 – 1 August 1969) was a German Formula One and sportscar driver.

Early life and career
Mitter was born in Schönlinde (Krásná Lípa) in Czechoslovakia, but his family was expelled from there, to Leonberg near Stuttgart.

After racing motorbikes, he switched to Formula Junior, becoming the best German driver with 40 victories. In addition, he sold two-stroke engines for FJ. In 1963, Mitter won the Formula Junior Eifelrennen at the Nürburgring.

Formula One

Mitter also participated in seven Grands Prix, debuting on 23 June 1963. He scored a total of three championship points in his home 1963 German Grand Prix with an old Porsche 718 from 1961. Impressed by this, Team Lotus gave him a chance in the following years.

Sportscar driver

In sportscar racing and hillclimbing for Porsche, he scored many wins, e.g. the 1966-1968 European Hillclimb Championships against Ferrari, the 1966 24 Hours of Daytona (Porsche 907, in class) and the 1969 Targa Florio (Porsche 908) as his final major win.

Return to Formula One and death

Due to the long Nürburgring track, it was possible to take part in the German Grand Prix with Formula 2 cars that were classified in their own contest. Mitter was killed there at Schwedenkreuz while practising for the 1969 German Grand Prix with BMW's 269 F2 project. As a suspension or steering failure was suspected, the BMW team with Hubert Hahne and Dieter Quester withdrew from the race, as did Mitter's teammate at Porsche, Hans Herrmann. Udo Schütz, his driving partner at Porsche in the 1969 World Sportscar Championship season with whom he had won the Targa three months earlier, had survived a bad crash at the 1969 24 Hours of Le Mans, and retired.

Racing record

Complete Formula One World Championship results
(key)

Complete Formula One Non-Championship results
(key)

Complete European Formula Two Championship results
(key)

Complete 24 Hours of Le Mans results

Complete 12 Hours of Sebring results

References

People from Krásná Lípa
Sudeten German people
German racing drivers
German Formula One drivers
European Formula Two Championship drivers
Racing drivers who died while racing
Sport deaths in Germany
24 Hours of Le Mans drivers
12 Hours of Reims drivers
Ecurie Maarsbergen Formula One drivers
Team Lotus Formula One drivers
BMW (1950s–60s) Formula One drivers
World Sportscar Championship drivers
Naturalized citizens of Germany
1935 births
1969 deaths
Porsche Motorsports drivers